Olga Korosteleva is a Russian-American statistician. She is a professor of statistics at California State University, Long Beach, and the author of several books on statistics.

Education and career
Korosteleva grew up in the Soviet Union, but was educated in the US after her father, statistician Alexander Korostelev, became a professor at Wayne State University. She went to Wayne State herself as an undergraduate, completing a bachelor's degree there in 1996, and then earned a Ph.D. in statistics from Purdue University in 2002. Her dissertation, Limit theorem for the spread of branching process with stabilizing drift, was supervised by Thomas Sellke.

As well as holding a faculty position at California State University, Long Beach, Korosteleva has served as president of the Southern California Chapter of the American Statistical Association, and editor-in-chief of the chapter newsletter.

Books
Korosteleva is the author or co-author of books including:
Clinical Statistics: Introducing Clinical Trials, Survival Analysis, and Longitudinal Data Analysis (Jones and Bartlett, 2009)
Mathematical Statistics: Asymptotic Minimax Theory (with Alexander Korostelev, Graduate Studies in Mathematics 119, American Mathematical Society, 2011)
Nonparametric Methods in Statistics with SAS Applications (CRC Press, 2013)
Advanced Regression Models with SAS and R (CRC Press, 2018)

References

Year of birth missing (living people)
Living people
American statisticians
Russian statisticians
Women statisticians
Wayne State University alumni
Purdue University alumni
California State University, Long Beach faculty